A ngan is a unit of area, equal to 400 square metres (20 m × 20 m), used for measuring land or property area. Its current size is precisely derived from the metre, but is neither part of nor recognized by the modern metric system, the International System (SI).

The ngan equals 1/4 rai or 100 tarang wa aka square wa, very nearly 1/10 of an acre. Ngan also means work.

It is commonly used in Thailand and equals four are, another unit based on the metre and as commonly used in several countries recognized though not encouraged by the SI.

As for many terms normally written in Thai alphabet, transliteration into English language caused a spelling variant, ngaan.

See also 
 Thai units of measurement
 1 E+2 m² for a comparison with other areas

References

Units of area
Thai units of measurement